Terence E. Kilburn (born 25 November 1926), known for his acting work prior to 1953 as Terry Kilburn, is an English-American actor. Born in London, he moved to Hollywood in the U.S. at the age of 10, and is best known for his roles as a child actor during the Golden Age of Hollywood, in films such as A Christmas Carol (1938) and Goodbye, Mr. Chips (1939) in the late 1930s and the early 1940s.

Early life
Kilburn was born in 1926 in West Ham, Essex, in Greater London to  working-class parents Tom and Alice Kilburn. He did some unpaid acting as a young child, and an agent encouraged him to go to Hollywood. Kilburn and his mother immigrated to the U.S. in 1937, and his father arrived the following year. A talent scout for MGM discovered him rehearsing for Eddie Cantor's radio show, and he was cast in the British-set film Lord Jeff (1938).

Career

Hollywood and Broadway
Known for his innocent, dreamy, doe-eyed look, Kilburn achieved fame at the age of 11 portraying Tiny Tim in the 1938 Metro-Goldwyn-Mayer film version of A Christmas Carol, and also as four generations of the Colley family in Goodbye, Mr. Chips (1939). He also played leading roles in two films which starred Freddie Bartholomew: Lord Jeff (1938) and Swiss Family Robinson (1940). He was featured in The Adventures of Sherlock Holmes (1939) with Basil Rathbone. In addition to Lord Jeff (1938), Kilburn worked alongside Mickey Rooney in Andy Hardy Gets Spring Fever (1939), A Yank at Eton (1942), and National Velvet (1944). In 1946 he was in Black Beauty. In his early 20s, in 1947 and 1948, he was in four back-to-back Bulldog Drummond films, as Seymour, a reporter; and in 1950 he had small roles in two seagoing films.

After high school, Kilburn concentrated on stage work, and studied drama at UCLA. He made his  Broadway debut, credited as Terrance Kilburn, as Eugene Marchbanks in a 1952 revival of George Bernard Shaw's Candida. He thereafter remained committed to live performances, as both an actor and director. After 1952, he was credited on screen as Terence Kilburn. His final feature film role was a small part in Lolita (1962). Between 1951 and 1969, he was also in nearly a dozen teleplays, television movies, and television series episodes.

After Hollywood: Directing plays in Michigan
From 1970 to 1994, Kilburn was artistic director of Oakland University's Meadow Brook Theatre in Rochester, Michigan. Meadow Brook Theatre is Michigan's only LORT theatre. It presents classic plays, comedies, and musicals, and is known for its annual production of Dickens' A Christmas Carol, adapted by Kilburn's partner, Charles Nolte.

Personal life
Since 1994 Kilburn has resided in Minneapolis, Minnesota. His partner of over 50 years, actor Charles Nolte, died in January 2010.

Filmography

References

External links

 

1926 births
Living people
American male film actors
American male child actors
American male stage actors
American male radio actors
American gay actors
English male film actors
English male child actors
English male stage actors
English male radio actors
English gay actors
20th-century English male actors
Metro-Goldwyn-Mayer contract players
British expatriates in the United States